"Walk Right Back" is a 1961 song by Sonny Curtis that was recorded by The Everly Brothers, and went to No. 7 on the U.S. Billboard Hot 100 chart.  Overseas, the song went to No. 1 on the UK Singles Chart for three weeks. Originally it was the B-side, then it was changed to the A-side.

In an interview he did with Jim Liddane of the International Songwriters Association, Sonny Curtis said about the song:

(It goes:

These eyes of mine that gave you loving glances once before, change to shades of cloudy gray. I want so very much to see you, just like before. I've got to know you're coming back to stay. Please believe me when I say, 'It's great to hear from you,' but there's a lot of things a letter just can't say, oh, me. Walk right back to me this minute ...,

etc.)

Other versions
Bobby Vee and The Ventures - for the album Bobby Vee Meets The Ventures (1963) 
The Move - at a BBC session (13 November 1969)
Harry Nilsson - on a BBC TV special The Music of Nilsson (1971)
Andy Williams - for his album Solitaire (1973)
Perry Como - a single release which reached No. 33 in the UK charts in 1973.
Val Doonican - for the album Some of My Best Friends Are Songs (1977).
Mud recorded the song for their Rock On album in 1978.
In 1978, the song was a #4 US Country hit (#3 US AC and #2 Canada Country) for Anne Murray. (Anne Murray discography). Murray also performed a version of her song on The Muppet Show.
Daniel O'Donnell and Mary Duff - for their album Timeless (1996).

Charts
The Everly Brothers

Anne Murray

References

1961 singles
1978 singles
Songs written by Sonny Curtis
The Everly Brothers songs
Andy Williams songs
Anne Murray songs
Number-one singles in New Zealand
UK Singles Chart number-one singles
Capitol Records singles
1961 songs